Lake Sarnen (German: Sarnersee) is a lake in the Swiss canton of Obwalden. The lake is on the Sarner Aa, which flows out of the Lake Lungern, through the Lake Sarnen, and into Lake Lucerne. The municipalities of Sarnen and Sachseln are located on the shores of the lake, and the Brünig railway line follows the eastern shore.

The lake is the subject of a watercolour painting by J. M. W. Turner, The Sarner See, Evening, c. 1842.

See also
List of lakes of Switzerland

References

External links

Waterlevels of Lake Sarnen at Sarnen

Sarnen
Sarnen
LSarnen